Harald III (or Harold III) may refer to:

 Harald III of Norway (1015–1066), well known as Harald Hadrada ("hard ruler")
 Harald III of Denmark  (1041–1080), well known as Harald Hen ("whetstone")
 Harald III, Earl of Orkney or Harald Eiriksson ( 1190s)